Henry Fielding may refer to:

Henry Fielding (1707–1754), English novelist and dramatist
Henry Borron Fielding (1805–1851), English botanist (whose father was also named Henry Fielding)
 William Henry Ireland published, in 1822 Henry Fielding's Proverbs

See also

Henry Feilden (disambiguation)